The fifth season of the CBS police procedural series The Mentalist premiered on September 30, 2012. As of this season, The Mentalist was scheduled to air on Sundays at 10:00 pm ET. The fourth, eighth and nineteenth episode of this season aired at 11:00 pm ET. The season finale aired on May 5, 2013.

Cast and characters

Main cast 
 Simon Baker as Patrick Jane (22 episodes)
 Robin Tunney as Teresa Lisbon (22 episodes)
 Tim Kang as Kimball Cho (22 episodes)
 Owain Yeoman as Wayne Rigsby (22 episodes)
 Amanda Righetti as Grace Van Pelt (18 episodes)

Recurring cast 
 Emmanuelle Chriqui as Lorelei Martins (4 episodes, one flashback episode)
 Polly Walker as FBI Regional Director Alexa Shultz (2 episodes, one flashback episode)
 Kevin Corrigan as Homeland Security Agent Bob Kirkland (6 episodes, one flashback episode)
 Ivan Sergei as FBI Agent Gabe Mancini (2 episodes)
 Henry Ian Cusick as Thomas Volker (3 episodes)
 Michael Gaston as Gale Bertram (4 episodes)
 Jack Plotnick as Brett Partridge (2 episodes)
 Pruitt Taylor Vince as J. J. LaRoche (3 episodes)

Notable guest cast 
 Catherine Dent as FBI Agent Susan Darcy  ("The Crimson Ticket") (flashback episode) 
 Drew Powell as FBI Agent Reede Smith  ("The Crimson Ticket") 
 William Forsythe as Steve Rigsby  ("Blood Feud") 
 Ian Anthony Dale as Detective Nathaniel Kim  ("Red Dawn") 
 Gregory Itzin as Virgil Minelli  ("Red Dawn") (flashback episode)  
 Samaire Armstrong as Summer Edgecombe  ("Panama Red") 
 Malcolm McDowell as Bret Stiles  ("Red Sails in the Sunset") 
 Reed Diamond as Ray Haffner  ("The Red Barn") 
 Robert Picardo as Jason Cooper  ("The Red Barn") 
 Dove Cameron as Charlotte Anne Jane  ("Devil's Cherry")  
 Gigi Rice as Dana Martins, mother of Lorelei and Miranda  ("Red Sails in the Sunset") 
 Jillian Bach as Sarah Harrigan  ("Black Cherry") 
 Mary Lynn Rajskub as Susie Hamblin  ("Days of Wine and Roses") 
 Eddie McClintock as Sgt. Hawkins  ("Red, White and Blue") 
 Kirk Acevedo as Christian Dos Santos  ("Red Dawn") 
Gabrielle McClinton as Miranda ("Behind the Red Curtain")

Episodes

DVD release 
All 22 episodes were included on the five disc complete fifth season set. It was released on September 17, 2013 in Region 1, October 14, 2013 in Region 2, and October 16, 2013 in Region 4. It included the featurettes "The Artistry of Action: From Script to Screen" and "Arresting Excitement: Keeping it Real with the CBI".

U.S. ratings

References

External links 
 
 
 

2012 American television seasons
2013 American television seasons
The Mentalist seasons